Egi or EGI may refer to:

Organizations 
 Editors Guild of India, an Indian journalism organisation 
 Europe-Georgia Institute, a Georgian non-governmental organisation
 Edward Grey Institute of Field Ornithology at Oxford University, England
 Euzko Gaztedi, the youth wing of the Basque Nationalist Party
 Excel Group Institutions, an Indian educational institution

People 
 Egi Kazuyuki (1853–1932), Japanese politician
 Egi Melgiansyah (born 1990), Indonesian footballer
 Egi, Ingush military leader during 15th century

Other uses 
 Duke Field (IATA: EGI), a military airport in Florida, United States
 Egi Station, in Maebashi, Gunma, Japan
 European Grid Infrastructure, a European high-throughput computing effort